Songs From This and Songs From That are a double extended play, from singer/songwriter Joy Williams, that go together to form a single album. They were both released on August 17, 2009.
Joy Williams was a member of The Civil Wars before their breakup in 2014, along with John Paul White.

Promotion
"Sunny Day" from Songs From This has been featured on an episode of 90210 and Grey's Anatomy, while "Speaking a Dead Language" from Songs From That has also been featured on the latter show. "Doesn't Get Better Than This" has become the promotional song for Oscar Mayer.

Track listing

References

2009 albums
Joy Williams (singer) albums